Shopworn is a 1932 American pre-Code romantic drama film directed by Nick Grinde and starring Barbara Stanwyck and Regis Toomey. Written by Jo Swerling and Robert Riskin, based on a story by Sarah Y. Mason, the film is about a poor hardworking waitress who meets and falls in love with a wealthy college student. His mother objects to the union and frames the waitress for a crime she did not commit. After serving her time, the waitress enters show business and becomes a star.

Plot
Waitress Kitty Lane and wealthy David Livingston fall in love. However his overly protective mother Helen does not approve and does everything she can to break them up. She has her friend Judge Forbes first try bribery; when that fails, he arranges to have her jailed on a bogus morals charge. Meanwhile, Mrs. Livingston convinces her son that Kitty took the $5000 bribe.

As the years pass, Kitty becomes a successful showgirl, with numerous admirers, while David is a doctor. When their paths cross again, their love is rekindled, though Kitty is skeptical of David's resolve in the face of his mother's unwavering opposition. David finally convinces her to marry him.

Alarmed, Mrs. Livingston goes to see Kitty. She begs her to break off the engagement, fearing her son's career will be ruined, but Kitty is unmoved.  In desperation, the distraught mother pulls out a gun. Kitty manages to take it away from the confused woman, but is touched by her pleas. When David shows up, Mrs. Livingston hides while Kitty puts on an act, pretending that she only agreed to marry him to get back at his mother. David is finally convinced, but then a repentant Mrs. Livingston stops him from leaving and confesses the truth.

Cast
 Barbara Stanwyck as Kitty Lane
 Regis Toomey as David Livingston
 ZaSu Pitts as Aunt Dot
 Lucien Littlefield as Fred
 Clara Blandick as Mrs. Helen Livingston
 Robert Alden as Toby
 Oscar Apfel as Judge Forbes
 Maude Turner Gordon as Mrs. Thorne
 Wallis Clark as Mr. Dean 
 Tom London as Pa Lane 
 Edwin Maxwell as Bierbauer 
 Harry Tenbrook as Workman (uncredited)

Critical response
In his review for The New York Times, Mordaunt Hall wrote that despite the performances of the actors, the film was "tedious":

References

External links
 
 
 
 

1932 films
1932 romantic drama films
American black-and-white films
American romantic drama films
Columbia Pictures films
1930s English-language films
Films directed by Nick Grinde
1930s American films